Ashley Marie "AzMarie" Livingston (born December 28, 1986) is an American fashion model, actress, singer and DJ who rose to fame after appearing on America's Next Top Model: British Invasion in 2012. Livingston was cast to play the role of Chicken on the Fox show Empire.

Early life
Livingston was born Ashley Marie Livingston in California's San Fernando Valley and raised in Milwaukee, Wisconsin. According to Livingston, the name "AzMarie" is an amalgam of her first and middle names, and she took the "Az". Livingston was raised primarily by her single mother.  Her father is gay, and Livingston describes the relationship between her parents as them being "best friends". She came out to him first as a lesbian, with her father being immediately accepting because of his own orientation; her mother taking more time, with initial disappointment. Now her mother is a strong supporter of her career. Livingston says she was bullied growing up over her androgyny. As a young child, she moved to the Milwaukee, Wisconsin area, where she later attended Nicolet High School. At age 9, Livingston became interested in modeling after traveling with her father on vacation to Los Angeles, California. but according to Livingston, "I took a break when I was younger because it didn't pick up as much. I wanted to have a childhood." After graduating high school, Livingston attended the University of Wisconsin-Whitewater before dropping out after three semesters and moving to Los Angeles to further her career.  She is primarily of African-American ancestry, but also partial German and Indian descent.

Career

Modeling
Livingston began her career as a runway model in Los Angeles and New York City. From 2009 to 2011, she appeared in many different magazines and participated in several fashion shows, including London Fashion Week and BET's Rip the Runway.

America's Next Top Model
In 2012, Livingston first came into the public eye as a participant in The CW program America's Next Top Model: British Invasion. She was noted for her tattoos and androgynous look. Despite her initial strength in the competition, including two first callouts, Livingston was eliminated in the sixth episode. She became the sixth eliminated overall in her first-ever bottom two appearance which Kyle Gober survived.

Acting
Livingston portrayed Hakeem's best friend Chicken on Fox's Empire. In 2009, Livingston appeared in the award-winning film Precious. In 2010, she went on to appear on the television shows The Real Housewives of New York City and The Jacksons: A Family Dynasty. After her stint on Top Model, Livingston acquired a role on the gay television series, DTLA, which airs on OUTtv and Logo. Working alongside actresses Melanie Griffith and Sandra Bernhard, Livingston plays the role of Ricki, who is Griffith's girlfriend on the show. Of her breakthrough role, Livingston says, "Being a rookie with all-stars made me a little nervous, but I don't think I showed it." Livingston starred in a leading role in the romantic comedy Almost Amazing by director Justin Price (The Cloth).

Music
Livingston started out as an extra in several music videos prior to her solo career as well as before competing on America's Next Top Model, including Kelly Rowland's "Motivation" and Nicki Minaj's "Moment 4 Life". As of 2012, she is reportedly working on an album; her debut single "Morning Guarantee" was released in December 2012. On August 31, 2014 Livingston released her debut EP on SoundCloud titled HipPopMelodicPoetry. Her single "We Hot" was released in 2015.

Filmography

Film
 Precious (2009)

Television
 The Real Housewives of New York City (2010)
 The Jacksons: A Family Dynasty (2010)
 America's Next Top Model: British Invasion (2012)
 DTLA (2012)
 Empire (2015)
 Grey's Anatomy (2015) as Intern
 The Purge (2018) as Bracka

Discography

Extended plays

Singles
 2012: Morning Guarantee
 2015: We Hot

Music videos

References

External links

1986 births
Living people
21st-century American actresses
Actresses from Louisiana
Actresses from Milwaukee
African-American actresses
African-American female models
American female models
African-American models
America's Next Top Model contestants
American film actresses
American people of German descent
American people of Indian descent
American television actresses
American lesbian actresses
American lesbian musicians
LGBT African Americans
LGBT models
LGBT people from California
LGBT people from Louisiana
LGBT people from Wisconsin
Musicians from Louisiana
Musicians from Wisconsin
Midwest hip hop musicians
University of Wisconsin–Whitewater alumni
21st-century American women musicians
20th-century LGBT people
21st-century LGBT people
African-American women musicians
21st-century African-American women
21st-century African-American musicians
20th-century African-American people
20th-century African-American women
Androgynous people